Waqurunchu (a possible spelling from Quechua, hispanicized spelling  Huaguruncho) is a mountain north of the Waqurunchu mountain range in the Andes of Peru, about  high. It is located in the Huánuco Region, Pachitea Province, Panao District, and in the Pasco Region, Pasco Province, Ticlacayan District.

References

Mountains of Peru
Mountains of Huánuco Region
Mountains of Pasco Region